The Hazard Communication Standard requires employers in the United States to disclose toxic and hazardous substances in workplaces. This is related to the Worker Protection Standard.

Specifically, this requires unrestricted employee access to the Material Safety Data Sheet or equivalent, and appropriate training needed to understand health and safety risks.

History

Workplace safety in the USA began long before Dr. Alice Hamilton in Chicago, who began working for the state of Illinois in 1910 to deal with workplace safety.

The Occupational Safety and Health Administration was established in 1970 to standardize safety for nearly all workers in the United States, and hazard communication for toxic substance exposure was included during the 1980s.

The Globally Harmonized System of Classification and Labeling of Chemicals (GHS) is currently being pursued to standardize workplace hazard protection internationally.

OSHA's Hazard Communication Standard (HAZCOM) was first adopted in 1983 in the United States with limited scope (48 FR 53280; November 25, 1983). In 1987, scope was expanded to cover all industries where employees are potentially exposed to hazardous chemicals (52 FR 31852; August 24, 1987). This is managed by the Occupational Safety and Health Administration. This is managed by states that have an approved plan.

The standard is identified in 29 C.F.R. 1910.1200. The summary is as follows.

Employers shall maintain copies of any material safety data sheets ...  and shall ensure that the material safety data sheets are readily accessible during each work shift to employees when they are in  their work area(s); and Employers shall ensure that employees are provided with information and training ... to detect the presence or release of a hazardous  chemical in the work area ... <and> the physical and health hazards of the chemicals in the work area ...

The United States Department of Defense does not manage hazards in accordance with public law.
 DoD and the right to know

Purpose

Employees access to hazard information is one of the prerequisites required for access to competent medical diagnosis and treatment.

Environmental illness share characteristics with common diseases. Cyanide exposure symptoms include weakness, headache, nausea, confusion, dizziness, seizures, cardiac arrest, and unconsciousness. Influenza and heart disease include the same symptoms. Failure to obtain proper disclosure is likely to lead to improper or ineffective medical diagnosis and treatment.

The Hazard Communication Standard requires the Safety Data Sheet to be made readily available for workplace exposure in the United States, because this information is required by physicians so they can do their job.

Physicians also require epidemiological data maintained by local government agencies responsible for maintaining pesticide application data for use outside buildings (environmental exposure). This is part of the Right to know.

References

Industrial hygiene
Safety engineering
Environmental law in the United States